Fiesta magazine was a British adult magazine featuring softcore pornography, published by Galaxy Publications Limited. It was a sister publication of Knave, launched two years later.

Launched in 1966 by the British photographer Russell Gay, Fiesta quickly became Britain's top-selling adult magazine. Dubbed "the magazine for men which women love to read", the monthly magazine's readers were responsible, in the early 1970s, for creating a feature that has been adopted in magazines worldwide: Readers' Wives. Central to this theme is the monthly "Readers' Wives Striptease" section, which shows a set of photos of a supposed wife or girlfriend of a reader being photographed by Fiesta undressing (often, but not always out of everyday clothing) to full nudity. The Readers' Wives section was the subject of a song by John Cooper Clarke on his album Disguise in Love.

As well as its Readers' Wives and photographic girl sets, Fiesta is built around a core of readers' letters from men and women. In addition there are male-interest features, cartoons and reviews, sexy puzzles and a regular erotic horoscope, together with Firkin, an underground-comics style cartoon strip drawn by Hunt Emerson and written by Tym Manley.

Mary Millington modelled for the magazine in 1974, prior to her exclusive signing to work for David Sullivan's magazines.

Nicholas Whittaker, journalist and author of Platform Souls, Blue Period and Sweet Talk, worked for the company from 1980 to 1982, when he left to go and work for Paul Raymond Publications, where he played a major role in establishing the new Razzle magazine. His experiences at Fiesta and Razzle are the subject of his book Blue Period.

Fiesta ceased production in 2020, after 54 years of publication.

See also
 Outline of British pornography
 Pornography in the United Kingdom

References

Further reading
 Attwood, F. (2002) 'A very British carnival: Women, sex and transgression in Fiesta magazine', in European Journal of Cultural Studies, 5 (1) 91–105.

Pornographic magazines published in the United Kingdom
Men's magazines published in the United Kingdom
Magazines established in 1966
Magazines disestablished in 2015
1966 establishments in the United Kingdom
2015 disestablishments in the United Kingdom